Blackwall is a rural locality in the local government area (LGA) of West Tamar in the Launceston LGA region of Tasmania, Australia. The 2016 census has a population of 270 for the state suburb of Blackwall.
It is a small town located near Gravelly Beach on the western side of the Tamar River, north of Launceston.

History 
Named after Blackwall on the River Thames in England, it was likewise a noted shipbuilding centre. The second-largest ship built in Tasmania during the 19th century, the 547-ton barque Harpley, was launched here in 1847.
Blackwall was gazetted as a locality in 1966.
Lanena Post Office opened on 1 April 1911, was renamed Blackwall in 1968, and closed in 1975.

Geography
The waters of the Tamar River estuary form the eastern boundary. Stony Brook forms the northern boundary.

Road infrastructure
Route C728 (Gravelly Beach Road) passes through from south-west to north-east.

References

Towns in Tasmania
Localities of West Tamar Council